Robert Potter Elmer (1877 – 1951) was an American archer, archery instructor, and medical doctor. He won seven American national archery championships in 1911, 1914, 1915, 1916, 1919, 1920, and 1922. He also served as the president of the National Archery Association (NAA) from 1914 to 1920. He received the NAA's Thompson Medal of Honor in 1948. He also wrote several books about archery and gave instruction on archery to students including Franklin D. Roosevelt and Douglas Fairbanks. In 1973, he was inducted into the Archery Hall of Fame. Aside from his archery career he graduated from the University of Pennsylvania Medical School and practiced medicine as a doctor for 47 years. He died in 1951 at age 73.

References

1877 births
1951 deaths
American male archers